Gehlen Catholic School is a PreK-12 Roman Catholic school located in LeMars, Iowa. Gehlen's athletic teams are known as the Jays. They compete in the War Eagle Conference with eight other teams from northwest Iowa. Their main rival is the other Roman Catholic school in the War Eagle, Remsen St. Mary's High School. Gehlen is located in the Roman Catholic Diocese of Sioux City. Their current high school principal is Pete Haefs and current elementary principal is Andrea Loutsch.

History

On May 29, 1952, construction began, and the school's first graduation was held on May 29, 1954.

Spalding Catholic High School merged with Gehlen's high school at the start of the 2013–14 school year. As separate programs, Spalding and Gehlen earned nine Iowa High School Athletic Association baseball championships total.

In 2017 Spalding Catholic closed its middle school, and those students were redirected to Gehlen.

Athletics
The Jays compete in the following sports in the War Eagle Conference:
Cross Country
 Girls' 1986 Class 1A State Champions
Volleyball
Football
 1995 Class A State Champions
Basketball
Wrestling
Track and Field
 Boys' 2-time State Champions (1989, 1996)
 Girls' 3-time Class 1A State Champions (1983, 1994, 2003)
Golf 
 Boys' 1998 Class 1A State Champions
Soccer
Baseball
 2-time Class 1A State Champions (1995, 1999) 
Softball

See also
List of high schools in Iowa

References

External links
 Gehlen Catholic School

Private schools in Iowa
Private high schools in Iowa
Catholic elementary schools in the United States
Catholic secondary schools in Iowa
Schools in Plymouth County, Iowa
Educational institutions established in 1953
1953 establishments in Iowa
Private K-12 schools in the United States